is a city located in Shizuoka Prefecture, Japan. , the city had an estimated population of 169,897 in 68,215 households  and a population density was 1,000 persons per km2. Iwata is widely known as the headquarters of the Yamaha Motor Corporation. Iwata is also home to Júbilo Iwata, a J. League soccer team, as well as Yamaha Jubilo, a rugby team.

Geography
Iwata is located in southwestern Shizuoka Prefecture, bordered by the Tenryū River to the west and with a small coastline on the Pacific Ocean to the south.

Surrounding municipalities
Shizuoka Prefecture
Hamamatsu
Fukuroi
Mori

Demographics
Per Japanese census data, the population of Iwata has been increasing over the past 60 years.

Climate
The city has a climate characterized by hot and humid summers, and relatively mild winters (Köppen climate classification Cfa).

History

Iwata is an ancient settlement, and human habitation dates from the Japanese Paleolithic period, with obsidian tools and shell middens having been found. Numerous kofun burial mounds are also found in the area of the city, which came under the control of the Yamato dynasty around the time of the semi-legendary Emperor Seimu. The Nara period provincial capital and provincial temple of Tōtōmi Province were located in Iwata. During the Edo period, it developed as a post station on the Tokaidō highway connecting Edo with Kyoto and contained Mitsuke-juku, one of the 53 stations on the road.

With the establishment of the modern municipalities system of the early Meiji period on October 1, 1889, Mitsuke Town within Iwata District, Shizuoka was established. Later that year, Nakaizumi Town and Ninomiya Village merged to form Nakaizumi Town. These two towns merged on November 1, 1940 with Saikai Village and Tenryū Village to form the new town of Iwata. Iwata was raised to city status on April 1, 1948.

On April 1, 2005, the neighboring towns of Fukude, Ryūyō and Toyoda, and the village of Toyooka (all from Iwata District) were merged into Iwata.

Government
Iwata has a mayor-council form of government with a directly elected mayor and a unicameral city legislature of 26 members. The city contributes three members to the Shizuoka Prefectural Assembly.

Economy
The economy of Iwata is primarily agricultural and is known for green tea and melons grown in greenhouses, which are called "Iwata melon". The Yamaha Corporation was founded in Iwata and maintains a strong presence in the city. Yamaha Motor's headquarters is in Iwata. Suzuki Motor Corporation has a vehicle assembly plant in Iwata.

Education
Shizuoka Sangyo University, a private university, is located in Iwata.

Shizuoka Professional University Junior College of Agriculture a public professional Junior college, is located in Iwata since 2020.

Iwata has 23 public elementary schools and 11 public middle schools operated by the city government. The city has four public high schools operated by the Shizuoka Prefectural Board of Education. The prefecture also operates two special education schools for the disabled.

Iwata also has two international schools, the CEP Brasil – Centro Educacional e Profissionalizante – Brazilian school and the Escola Objetivo de Iwata Tia Rosa, a Brazilian primary school Iwata formerly hosted another Brazilian school, a primary school called Escola Nipo-Brasileira de Iwata.

Transportation

Railway
 Central Japan Railway Company -  Tōkaidō Main Line
  – 
Tenryū Hamanako Railroad Tenryū Hamanako Line
  –  –

Highway
  Tōmei Expressway

Sister cities
 – Dagupan, Philippines from February 19, 1975
 – Mountain View, California, United States from June 4, 1976

Local attractions

National Historic Sites
Tōtōmi Kokubun-ji
Former Mitsuke School
Mikuriyama Kofun group
Shinpōinyama Kofun group
Chōshizuka Kofun

Other

Near the north exit of JR Iwata Station is the Great Camphor tree of Zendo-ji. Believed to be 700 years old, it was once within the grounds of a Buddhist temple called Zendo-ji. Its height is 18.3 meters and its diameter at chest height is 2.87 meters. The root structure bulges out of the ground creating a second level, and the circumference at the portion touching the surface is 32.9 meters.

Notable people from Iwata
Masami Nagasawa – actress
Saori Atsumi – singer-songwriter
Ryosuke Sasagaki – professional soccer player
Jun Mizutani – professional table-tennis player
Noriko Mizoguchi – judoka
Mima Ito – professional table-tennis player
Shuji Ishikawa - professional wrestler

References

External links

  

 
Cities in Shizuoka Prefecture
Populated coastal places in Japan